MelindaJ "Mindy" Barbieri (born 16 May 2000) is an Australian soccer player who plays for Adelaide United in the Australian A-League Women. She has previously played for Melbourne Victory. She has represented Australia in the Australia women's national under-20 soccer team.

Club career

Melbourne Victory
Barbieri signed with Melbourne Victory in 2015. She made her debut on 17 October 2015 in a match against Perth Glory. She made twelve appearances for the team during the 2015–16 W-League season. She scored her first goal against Western Sydney Wanderers on 12 December 2015. She scored her second goal of the season against Sydney FC on 26 December 2015. Victory finished in ninth place during the regular season with a  record.  In May 2016, she was awarded the club's Young Player of the Year award.

Barbieri returned to the squad for the 2016–17 W-League season.

On 20 September 2017, following the W-League's new CBA allowing multi-year contracts, Barbieri signed a two-year contract with Melbourne Victory.

Box Hill United
Following the 2021–22 A-League Women season, Barbieri joined National Premier Leagues Victoria Women (NPLVW) club Box Hill United for the off-season. During the 2022 NPLVW season, she scored 3 goals in 18 appearances.

Adelaide United
After seven seasons with Melbourne Victory in which she made 66 appearances, in September 2022, Barbieri joined Adelaide United.

International career
Barbieri has represented Australia on the Australia women's national under-20 soccer team. In July 2016, her hat-trick against Timor-Leste helped set a new goal-scoring record at the 2016 AFF Women's Championship.

Playing statistics

Honours 
with Melbourne Victory
 Young Player of the Year

See also

References

Further reading
 Grainey, Timothy (2012), Beyond Bend It Like Beckham: The Global Phenomenon of Women's Soccer, University of Nebraska Press, 
 Stewart, Barbara (2012), Women's Soccer: The Passionate Game, Greystone Books,

External links
 

2000 births
Living people
Australian women's soccer players
Melbourne Victory FC (A-League Women) players
Adelaide United FC (A-League Women) players
Women's association football midfielders
Soccer players from Melbourne
People from Fitzroy, Victoria